Titch can refer to the following:

As a nickname:
Barclay Bailes (1883–1955), Australian rules footballer
Arthur Edwards (footballer, born 1915) (1915–2002), Australian rules footballer
William Horne (footballer) (1885–1930), English goalkeeper for Plymouth Argyle
Titch Moore (born 1976), South African golfer
Michael Phelan (hurler) (born 1967), Irish former hurler

Other uses:
Titch (TV series), a 1990s television series shown on CITV
Titch, a character in the UK comic strip Ball Boy (Beano)
Crazy Titch, English grime MC
Taylor Titch, a 1960s British homebuilt aircraft design

See also
 Tich (disambiguation)

Lists of people by nickname